Øystre Slidre is a municipality in Innlandet county, Norway. It is located in the traditional district of Valdres. The administrative centre of the municipality is the village of Heggenes. Other villages in the municipality include Hegge, Rogne, Volbu, Moane, Skammestein, Beito, and Beitostølen.

The  municipality is the 120th largest by area out of the 356 municipalities in Norway. Øystre Slidre is the 221st most populous municipality in Norway with a population of 3,252.

General information 

The municipality of Øystre Slidre was established in 1849 when the old municipality of Slidre (created in 1838) was divided into Øystre Slidre (population: 2,406) and Vestre Slidre (population: 3,130). On 1 January 1882, a small area of Vang Municipality (population: 31) was transferred to the neighboring Øystre Slidre Municipality. On 1 January 1899, a small unpopulated area of Øystre Slidre was transferred to Vestre Slidre. On 1 January 2021, the Skjelgrenda area of Vestre Slidre was transferred to Øystre Slidre.

Name 
The municipality (originally the parish) is named after the old Slidre farm, since the first Slidre Church was built here. In 1849, the municipality and parish was divided into two and the word Øystre (or historically Østre) was added to the beginning of the name. Øystre means "eastern", so the meaning of the name Øystre Slidre is "(the) eastern (part of) Slidre".

Coat of arms 
The coat of arms was granted in 1989. The arms are covered with blue and silver/white tiles made of slate. This recognizes that the slate industry was a formerly important industry in the area. Slate roofing was very common in Valdres.

Churches
The Church of Norway has four parishes within the municipality of Gausdal. It is part of the Valdres prosti (deanery) in the Diocese of Hamar.

History 
 ("The boat pass") is a narrow pass along the mountain Bitihorn where in medieval times people from Øystre Slidre dragged their boats through, therefore the name. A bit further into the mountain there is a big lake called Vinstre with a lot of fine trout. As a result of a dispute between people from Valdres and people from Gudbrandsdalen, they could not leave their boats behind. Therefore, they had to resort to dragging their boats through Båtskaret. According to local folklore, the dispute began in medieval times with a young bride being married to an old man and a knight stealing his way over the mountains to rescue her.

Hegge Stave Church was originally constructed around the year 1216 in the village of Hegge. It has been extensively rebuilt and is mostly post-reformation. It contains a fine altarpiece (reredos) carved by Eistein Kjørn from Heidal between 1781 and 1782.

Geography 

Some of the notable mountains in the municipality include Gråhøi, Kalvemellen, Kvernhøi, Rabalsmellen, Raslet, Rundemellen, Skaget, and Skarvemellen. Lakes and rivers cover  of the area. The largest lakes are Vinstre, Yddin, Vangsjøen, Javnin, Olevatn, Nedre Heimdalsvatn, Øyangen, and Sandvatnet/Kaldfjorden/Øyvatnet.

Government
All municipalities in Norway, including Øystre Slidre, are responsible for primary education (through 10th grade), outpatient health services, senior citizen services, unemployment and other social services, zoning, economic development, and municipal roads.  The municipality is governed by a municipal council of elected representatives, which in turn elects a mayor.  The municipality falls under the Vestre Innlandet District Court and the Eidsivating Court of Appeal.

Municipal council
The municipal council  of Øystre Slidre is made up of 21 representatives that are elected to four year terms.  The party breakdown of the council is as follows:

Mayor
The mayors of Øystre Slidre (incomplete list):

1945 - 1947: Gullik K. Hovi (V)
1948 - 1955: Haldor Hegge (V)
1956 - 1959: Knut Bjørnstad (Sp)
1960 - 1963: Haldor Hegge (V)
1964 - 1975: Knut Bjørnstad (Sp)
1976 - 1979: Nils T. Windingstad (Sp)
1980 - 1991: Knut Bergo (V)
1992 – 1997: Terje Stenseng (Sp)
1997 – 1999: Ola Fjelltun (Sp)
1999 – 2003: Ove Skaret (Ap)
2003 - 2011: Gro Lundby (Ap)
2011 - 2019: Kjell Berge Melbybråten (Ap)
2019 - present: Odd Erik Holden (Sp)

Economy 

Because of the rugged landscape, farming is only possible on a small scale, but this is still one of the main sources of income. About 85% of farmers in the municipality use the high mountain pastures in the summer time. 

The winter sports resort of Beitostølen, host to World Cup events in biathlon and cross-country skiing, is located here. It is the biggest tourist area in the municipality, and provides a large fraction of the municipality's income.

Notable residents 
 Olav Beito (1901–1989), linguist and academic
 Torger Hovi (1905–1980) a politician, deputy mayor of Øystre Slidre 1959–1961
 Torleiv Bolstad (1915–1979) a Norwegian musician and Hardanger fiddle player

References

External links 

Municipal fact sheet from Statistics Norway 
Official website 
Beitostølen Resort 

 
Municipalities of Oppland
Valdres
1849 establishments in Norway